Krynka  is a village in the administrative district of Gmina Łuków, within Łuków County, Lublin Voivodeship, in eastern Poland.

The village has a population of 1,300.

References

Krynka